The Egyptian Trade Union Federation (ETUF) is a trade union based in Cairo, Egypt.

History and profile

The ETUF was founded in 1957 as a state-controlled union. Until 2011 all unions other than the ETUF were banned. During the Egyptian Revolution of 2011 ETUF leaders were active in defending the Mubarak regime, including participating in attacks on peaceful protestors.

References

1957 establishments in Egypt
Trade unions established in 1957
Trade unions in Egypt
International Confederation of Arab Trade Unions
Organisation of African Trade Union Unity
Economy of the Arab League